Tausonite is the rare naturally occurring mineral form of strontium titanate: chemical formula: SrTiO3. It occurs as red to orange brown cubic crystals and crystal masses.

It is a member of the perovskite group.

It was first described in 1982 for an occurrence in a syenite intrusive in Tausonite Hill, Murun Massif, Olyokma-Chara Plateau, Sakha Republic, Yakutia, geologically part of the Aldan Shield, Eastern-Siberian Region, Russia. It was named for Russian geochemist Lev Vladimirovich Tauson (1917–1989). It has also been reported from a fenite dike associated with a carbonatite complex in Sarambi, Concepción Department, Paraguay. and in high pressure metamorphic rocks along the Kotaki River area of Honshu Island, Japan.

References

Oxide minerals
Titanium minerals
Strontium minerals
Cubic minerals
Minerals in space group 221